Il Caimano del Piave is a 1951 Italian war-melodrama film directed by Giorgio Bianchi.

Plot 
After completing her studies, Lucilla di Torrebruna returns to San Donà di Piave where her father, a cavalry colonel, is about to marry Helène in a second marriage. Seeing her father happy with her the girl bears the hostility of her stepmother. The First World War breaks out and Franco, a fellow student of Lucilla, leaves Trieste to enter Italian territory to enlist in the Bersaglieri but due to the defeat of Caporetto the Austrians occupy the town of San Donà and the Torrebruna villa becomes the headquarters of the command military and Helène reveals that she is a pro-Austrian spy.

The colonel and Franco, who has become an officer of the Arditi, organize a network of espionage in favor of the Italians and during one of these raids the colonel is wounded and it is Lucilla who takes his place. She is captured and sentenced to death, but the cavalry led by Franco manages to save her at the last minute.

Cast
 Gino Cervi as Il colonnello di Torrebruna
 Milly Vitale as Lucilla di Torrebruna
 Frank Latimore as Franco
 Francesco Golisano as Il contadino Ciampin Zoppo (as Geppa)
 Harry Feist as Ufficiale austriaco
 Carlo Croccolo as Esposito
 Ludmilla Dudarova	as Helene 
 Gianni Musy as Goffredo (as Gianni Glori)
 Fausto Tozzi

References

External links
 
 Il Caimano del Piave at Variety Distribution

1951 films
1950s Italian-language films
Films directed by Giorgio Bianchi
World War I spy films
World War I films set on the Italian Front
Films scored by Enzo Masetti
Melodrama films
Italian war drama films
1950s war drama films
Italian black-and-white films
1950s Italian films